The Asociación de Scouts de Bolivia (ASB) is the national Scouting association of Bolivia. Scouting was founded in Bolivia in 1911 and became a member of the World Organization of the Scout Movement in 1950. ASB has 7,898 members (as of 2011).

Scouting is active in rural and urban areas of the country, and open to all young people of all religions. 90% of all members are Catholic, and the church sponsors many groups.

The Asociación de Scouts de Bolivia prides itself on having members of many social classes, both the cities and rural areas. There are groups for handicapped children. There has been a great effort to make Scouting available to handicapped and disadvantaged youngsters, including youngsters in state orphanages.

Many Scout activities involve community service projects such as environmental protection, food production, tree planting and literacy.

The Scouts have built several community development centers with the help of the German Scouts, American Scouts, and Spanish Scouts, among many others. These community centers are located in Cochabamba (headquarters); where a library and some other community development buildings are located, besides a convention center; La Paz (past headquarters), also a library and other community development buildings, featuring assistance centers; and Santa Cruz. Other community centers are scheduled to be built, as of 2006.

Program and ideals
Lobatos-ages 6 to 10
Exploradores-ages 11 to 14
Pioneros-ages 15 to 17
Rovers-ages 18 to 21

The Scout Motto is Siempre Listo, Always Prepared.

The membership badge of the Asociación de Scouts de Bolivia incorporates a tulip in the national colors of the flag of Bolivia.

Regions
The Scout Movement in Bolivia represented as Asociacion de Scouts de Bolivia, is present in 8 of the 9 administrative divisions (departments): La Paz, Cochabamba (where the main office is), Santa Cruz, Oruro, Potosí, Tarija, Chuquisaca and Beni, there is still the task to found an office on Pando.

Scout Oath

Por mi honor prometo, hacer cuanto de mí dependa para cumplir mis deberes para con Dios, los demas y conmigo mismo, ayudar al prójimo en toda circunstancia y cumplir fielmente la Ley Scout.

For my honor, I promise to do my best to fulfill my duties to God, others and myself, to help my fellow man in any circumstances and to faithfully keep the Scout Law.

Scout Law
El Scout cifra su honor en ser digno de confianza
El Scout es leal, cortés y caballeroso
El Scout es útil y ayuda a los demás sin esperar recompensa alguna
El Scout es amigo de todo y hermano de cualquier Scout
El Scout es acogedor y combate la injusticia
El Scout cuida la obra de Dios, ama la vida y protege a plantas y animales
El Scout sabe obedecer y siempre termina lo que empieza
El Scout tiene valor, sonríe y canta en sus dificultades
El Scout es económico, trabajador y respetuoso del derecho ajeno
El Scout es limpio de cuerpo, pensamiento, palabra y obra

See also
 Asociación de Guías Scouts de Bolivia

References

World Organization of the Scout Movement member organizations
Scouting and Guiding in Bolivia

Youth organizations established in 1911